The metropolitan area of Phoenix in the U.S. state of Arizona contains one of the nation's largest and fastest-growing freeway systems, with over 1,405 lane miles (2,261 km) as of 2005 (this was before construction on the Loop 303 started).

Due to the lack of any form of mass transit besides bus prior to 2008, the Phoenix Metropolitan Area has remained a very automobile-dependent city, with its first freeway opening in 1958—a year preceding most cities' first freeway openings. Coupled with the explosive growth of the region and adequate funding, the result is one of the nation's most expansive freeway networks.

The backbone of Phoenix's freeway system is composed of three major freeways—Interstate 10, Interstate 17, and U.S. Route 60. Interstate 10, being a transcontinental route between California and Florida, is the most heavily traveled freeway in the Valley of the Sun. Interstate 17 runs down the center of Arizona, connecting Phoenix with Sedona, Prescott, Flagstaff and the Grand Canyon. U.S. Route 60 spans most of the country, but is only a freeway for a few short stints, one of them being in the East Valley. West of Phoenix, it shuttles travelers to cities such as Wickenburg, Kingman and Las Vegas (by way of a connection in Wickenburg with U.S. Route 93). In addition to these three freeways, three beltways, Routes 101, 202, and 303 loop around Phoenix, the East Valley, and the West Valley, respectively. State Route 51 connects Downtown with the northern reaches of the city, and Arizona State Route 143 is a distributor for Phoenix Sky Harbor International Airport.

There was significant local opposition in the 1960s and 1970s to expansion of the freeway system. Because of this, by the time public opinion began to favor freeway expansion in the 1980s and 1990s, Phoenix freeways had to be funded primarily by local sales tax dollars rather than diminishing sources of federal money; newer freeways were, and are, given state route designation as opposed to Interstate designation.  Primarily due to this, Phoenix is the largest city in the United States to have at least two Interstate Highways, but no three-digit Interstates.

Existing freeways

Interstate 10

Papago Freeway
This is Arizona's widest and most congested freeway, entering the metropolitan area on its western edge in the city of Buckeye as the Papago Freeway. It continues eastward through the cities of Goodyear, Avondale, and Tolleson; where it has an interchange with northbound Loop 101. Following Tolleson, I-10 reaches Phoenix's western city limits, and as it approaches downtown, there is a four-level symmetrical stack interchange with Interstate 17 known by locals as The Stack.

There are numerous construction projects along the Papago Freeway spanning both east and westbound from around Dysart Road in Avondale, to Verrado Way in Buckeye. The projects are expected to convert the current 4 lane divided freeway into a 6 to 10 lane divided freeway.  The main project is complete. Along with the anticipation of the completion of SR 30, traffic coming in and out of Phoenix is anticipated to be less congested, and easier to manage.

Inner Loop
Beyond The Stack, Interstate 10 proceeds eastward through a tunnel underneath Downtown.  The tunnel is locally called the Deck Park Tunnel, as Margaret T. Hance Park is located above.  Following the tunnel, it reaches the Mini Stack interchange with Loop 202 and SR 51. Turning southward at this interchange, I-10 runs adjacent to Sky Harbor International Airport before an interchange with the southern terminus of I-17.

History
Back in the 1960s, the initial plan to construct the Inner Loop involved an elevated freeway ten stories high. It also involved two "helicoil" interchanges. However, this proposal became very controversial among Phoenix residents and the Arizona Republic newspaper advocated against it. They were concerned that the proposed freeway would be costly, an eyesore, and various other reasons. Oppositions continually grew to the point when in 1973, a referendum was held. The majority of the Phoenix voters voted against the freeway; effectively striking down the elevated Papago Inner Loop.

A new plan to revive the once-killed Papago Inner Loop Freeway involved having a tunnel. However, in 1975, the new plan was unsuccessful as the majority of voters opposed it. However, it became a success in 1979 as the majority of voters supported it. Construction of the Inner Loop began in 1983 and was finished in August 1990. This completion made the freeway the final connection of the whole I-10.

Maricopa Freeway

After this second I-17 interchange, I-10 occupies the eastern leg of the Maricopa Freeway, presumably named after the Native American tribe for which the county is also named. It regains its primary eastward direction as it crosses the Salt River, but after meeting SR 143 it turns south again via the Broadway Curve, where it enters the city of Tempe.  There, an interchange with US 60 is located. The freeway enters its final city in the Valley of the Sun, Chandler, where Loop 202 intersects I-10 at another four-level symmetrical stack interchange before the Interstate enters the Gila River Indian Community and continues on through the undeveloped stretch of desert between Phoenix and the fast-growing town of Casa Grande before making its way southeast toward the Tucson metropolitan area.

Interstate 17

Black Canyon Freeway
I-17 enters the valley from the north as the Black Canyon Freeway, in the New River and Anthem area before a four-level interchange with Loop 101. It then continues directly southward on the 27th and 25th Avenue alignments in northern Phoenix, passing Metrocenter Mall as it heads directly for downtown. Another four-level stack awaits I-17 when it meets Interstate 10 immediately northwest of downtown at The Stack.

Maricopa Freeway
At Durango Street, in the segment of freeway known as the Durango Curve, the highway turns eastward, becoming the western leg of the Maricopa Freeway, and provides a southerly bypass of downtown before meeting I-10 again near Sky Harbor and terminating (the Maricopa Freeway, though, continues eastward with the I-10 designation). Interstate 17 was the Valley's first freeway, with maps showing a road built to Interstate Highway standards (of the era) by 1961, in some segments.

State Route 24

SR 24, the Williams Gateway Freeway, is located in southeast Mesa near the Phoenix-Mesa Gateway Airport (after which the freeway was named). Although the plan is to connect the entire freeway to either US 60 or another highway alignment in western Pinal County, only a portion of the freeway between Loop 202 and Ironwood Drive has been constructed and was opened in August 2022.  The rest of the freeway is to be constructed as plans are finalized and funding becomes available.

The Williams Gateway Freeway (formerly SR 802) is currently under study in Pinal County; a public hearing on the draft environmental assessment was held in Fall 2010.

State Route 51

The Piestewa Freeway begins at the Mini Stack interchange with I-10 and Loop 202, and proceeds north through Phoenix towards Piestewa Peak (formerly known as Squaw Peak). After passing near Paradise Valley, Route 51 reaches its northern terminus at Loop 101.

This freeway was formerly known as the Squaw Peak Parkway, but since "Squaw" is regarded as a derogatory term for Native American women, the Arizona Board of Geographic and Historic Names rechristened the mountain "Piestewa" Peak after Lori Piestewa, a Native American woman who died in the conflict with Iraq. The name change was controversial, with some residents still referring to both the freeway and the landmark peak as Squaw Peak.

U.S. Route 60 (Superstition Freeway)

US 60 enters the Valley of the Sun within Pinal County borders in Apache Junction. After crossing into Maricopa County and into east Mesa, a four-level interchange dubbed the SuperRedTan awaits motorists. This interchange, completed in 2007, provides access to the Red Mountain and Santan Freeway segments of Loop 202. Continuing westward past the interchange, the freeway passes through the heart of Mesa before meeting Loop 101 and eventually duplexing with westbound I-10 near Tempe before beginning its concurrency with I-17 in Phoenix.

Loop 101

Agua Fria Freeway
Loop 101 begins in the city of Tolleson as the Agua Fria Freeway at a junction with Interstate 10. Proceeding northward through the West Valley cities of Glendale and Peoria, Loop 101 turns eastward along the Beardsley Road alignment. In the northern section of Phoenix, there is an interchange with Interstate 17, which is where the Pima Freeway segment begins.

Pima Freeway
Remaining eastbound, the freeway meets the northern terminus of Route 51, continues eastbound, and then turns southward, passing through the northern part of Scottsdale.  It then continues south along the relatively undeveloped border between Scottsdale and the Salt River Pima-Maricopa Indian Community.  Loop 101 meets no freeways again until the Loop 202 four-level stack, which is located partially over the Salt River to create the state's longest bridge, at more than one mile in total length over water.

Price Freeway
Proceeding southward as the Price Freeway, Loop 101 enters Tempe and encounters a junction with US 60 before entering Chandler and terminating at Loop 202.

State Route 143

Originally signed as Business I-10, the Hohokam Expressway is a relatively short north–south freeway that runs east of Sky Harbor International Airport, between Loop 202 and Interstate 10. Its primary purpose is to distribute east side airport traffic from and to Eastbound Loop 202 and I-10 without utilizing stop-and-go surface streets.

A recently completed project added two new directional ramps for traffic directed to the airport and to southbound SR 143 destined for I-10 and reconstructed an existing loop ramp from northbound SR 143 to westbound Sky Harbor Boulevard. There are no additional plans to upgrade or reconstruct any portions of the nearly four-mile expressway.

Loop 202

Red Mountain Freeway
The Red Mountain Freeway begins at the Mini Stack junction with Route 51 and Interstate 10 before heading east into Tempe. Route 143 and Loop 101 intersect the Red Mountain Freeway at various points in the city prior to the road entering the northern reaches of Mesa, where it had temporarily ended at Power Road. The final segment of the Red Mountain Freeway from Power Road to University Drive opened on July 21, 2008. The freeway then continues due southward towards US 60, until it bisects it at the SuperRedTan Interchange, beyond which Loop 202 becomes the Santan Freeway.

During the early years of planning, the segment east of the Mini Stack was designated as the "East Papago Freeway" and extended to a proposed alignment that routed the freeway through the Papago Buttes and on into south Scottsdale along McDowell Road. However, after later revisions moved the (current) alignment to angle southeasterly along 52nd St and then skirt the north bank of the Salt River, the freeway was renamed the Red Mountain Freeway, avoiding confusion with the I-10 Papago Freeway and helping to more consistently identify with future extension to Mesa.

Santan Freeway
The Santan Freeway segment comprises the southern half of the partial beltway and begins at US 60, heading south into the town of Gilbert. Turning westward near Phoenix-Mesa Gateway Airport, the freeway passes through Chandler with an interchange at the southern terminus of Loop 101. Loop 202 proceeds westward, following the Pecos Road alignment until meeting its current terminus at I-10—where an interchange was built with Loop 202 expansion westward in mind.

South Mountain Freeway
The South Mountain Freeway, officially the Congressman Ed Pastor Freeway, is a southerly bypass of Downtown Phoenix which runs along the southern edge of the Ahwatukee neighborhood of Phoenix and passes just to the south and west of South Mountain Park. It begins at the already complete traffic interchange of the Santan Freeway and Interstate 10. Heading west along the former Pecos Road alignment through Ahwatukee, the freeway straddles the border with the Gila River Indian Reservation. Turning northwest and eventually north, the freeway follows the 59th and 55th Avenue alignments north to its terminus with Interstate 10 (Papago Freeway) in west Phoenix.

This freeway has long been considered to be the missing link by the region's planners, who hope to better move regional traffic and provide a better option for vehicles to avoid metro Phoenix.

In March 2015, the Federal Highway Administration issued a Record of Decision selecting a build alternative. Freeway construction began in early 2016, with the Chandler Boulevard extension project to facilitate local access beginning in summer 2015. The freeway was planned to be open to traffic in late 2019 or early 2020. The Ed Pastor Freeway was officially opened on December 21, 2019.

Community opposition did exist, mainly from residents of Ahwatukee. While the Maricopa Association of Governments had considered building a limited access parkway or arterials along the freeway's proposed route, the eight-lane freeway concept ultimately was pushed by the region's planners to meet the traffic needs at close to the same cost. For most of 2010, the Gila River Indian Community, Maricopa Association of Governments, City of Phoenix, ADOT and others discussed movement of the alignment to tribal land, but no agreements were reached.

Loop 303

Loop 303 (Bob Stump Memorial Parkway) is a freeway in the west part of the Phoenix Metropolitan Area, serving cities such as Surprise, Peoria, Glendale, and northern Phoenix. The freeway begins its southern terminus at Van Buren Street, one mile south of I-10. There is a stack interchange with I-10, and then the freeway continues north for 15 miles, passing through various arterial road interchanges. After the parclo interchange with U.S. 60, the route curves northeast for six miles, just north of Sun City West. The route then curves north for five miles through Peoria before turning back east for 10 miles to meet its northern terminus at an at-grade intersection with the I-17. Eventually, the at-grade intersection will be upgraded to a freeway-to-freeway interchange. 

In the future, there will be an extension south of Van Buren Street to the planned SR 30 and possibly even further south to Interstate 11.

Northern Parkway

The Northern Parkway is a controlled-access parkway in Glendale, near Luke AFB. Beginning at an interchange with Loop 303, it follows the Butler Drive alignment (half a mile south of Olive Avenue) for about four miles until turning southeast to align with Northern Avenue right before its current terminus at Dysart Road. It is intended to relieve heavy traffic on Northern Avenue, some being contributed by the nearby military base.

Phase II plans for construction of the route between Dysart Road and Loop 101, including multiple grade-separated intersections, with a completely controlled-access interchange where it will meet with Loop 101. Construction is projected to start in 2015 or 2016. Phase III, which will run from Loop 101 to US 60, is currently unfunded with no construction dates set.

Cancelled and former highways

State Route 50

SR 50, the Paradise Parkway, was part of Proposition 300 in 1985 as State Route 317. On December 18, 1987, SR 317 was renumbered SR 50. SR 50 was removed from the system on December 15, 1994, when then governor Fife Symington made some funding cuts that included removal of the Paradise Parkway and Estrella Freeway from the system entirely. (The Estrella Freeway was re-added to the system when Proposition 400 was passed ten years later in 2004.) Route 50 will not be re-added to the system, because in February 1996 the ADOT auctioned off all the right-of-way it had purchased for the freeway, which was to be located between Loop 101 and Route 51 in the Central Valley. A similar, though not identical path with high capacity lanes is being taken by the modern Northern Parkway (Arizona) which is being funded by Maricopa County and the associated cities adjoining the roadway.

State Route 153

The Sky Harbor Expressway was a small remnant of the old northern alignment of Route 143. Beginning at Washington Street, the former expressway headed south, under the Union Pacific Railroad, to an interchange with the airport entrance, before a bridge over the Salt River parallel to and just a few hundred feet away from the bridge on Route 143. The former expressway then ended at University Avenue with no further planned extension to Interstate 10.

Route 153 was deleted from the Regional Transportation Plan starting in May 2007, and much of the western half of the original alignment was re-used as right-of-way for the Sky Train people mover at Phoenix Sky Harbor International Airport. It is now an extension of 44th Street.

Other major highways

U.S. Route 60 (Grand Avenue)

US 60 westbound ends its duplex with I-17 at Thomas Road and heads west to the intersection with 27th Avenue, where it turns right before entering Grand Avenue, a diagonal surface street in the northwestern part of the Phoenix metro area.  US 60 continues 54 miles northwest to Wickenburg and is the only major surface street to not follow the grid system of Phoenix. This road predates significant city development and remains a primary transportation corridor.  The cities of Glendale, Peoria and Surprise were founded with their centers using Grand as their main road.  In the early 2000s, several major six-legged intersections were eliminated along Grand Avenue in Phoenix, Glendale, and Peoria to improve traffic flow. Complicating the design of these improvements and compounding the traffic woes they hoped to solve is the presence of the BNSF railroad, which closely parallels Grand to the south in Phoenix and Glendale and to the north between Peoria and Morristown.

State Route 74 (Carefree Highway)

Arizona State Route 74 is a two-lane highway that connects U.S. Route 60 southeast of Wickenburg to I-17, passing through the Lake Pleasant Regional Park area.

State Route 85

Arizona State Route 85, currently the only non-freeway segment of the route connecting Phoenix with San Diego, is used as route for traffic to bypass the urban core of Phoenix, and has been identified by the state as a potential alignment of the CANAMEX Corridor through Arizona.  As such, future plans include fully upgrading the roadway to freeway status by converting existing at-grade intersections to controlled-access intersections, and preliminary study and engineering to create a full freeway-to-freeway interchange with Interstate 8 near Gila Bend is under way.  However, the current Regional Transportation Plan does not include funding for these improvements.

Beginning in 2002, work began on a phased implementation plan to upgrade Route 85 from a two-lane rural highway to a four-lane divided highway from its junction with Interstate 10 to just north of the town of Gila Bend.  The construction plan, which included a controlled-access intersection with Patterson Road and improvements to the junction with Route 238 in Gila Bend, was completed in 2010.

State Route 87

Arizona State Route 87, currently the Highway connecting from I-10 in Picacho, to SR-84 in Picacho, to SR-287, to SR-387, to SR-187, to SR-587, to Loop 202 in Chandler, to US-60 in Mesa, to Loop 202 in Mesa, to SR-188, to SR-260, to SR-99, to I-40 in Winslow, to finally SR-264 in 2nd Mesa. Arizona State Route 87 is similar to SR-85 & SR-74, and its also in Maricopa County.

Proposed and future freeways

Interstate 11

Interstate 11, the Hassayampa Freeway, is a proposed Interstate Highway in the United States to run from Casa Grande, Arizona, northwest to Las Vegas, Nevada, by way of Kingman, Arizona. The highway will parallel and/or upgrade existing U.S. 93 north of Wickenburg; south of Wickenburg, it will follow a new freeway near the Hassayampa River, turning Southeast near southern Goodyear, through Casa Grande and Interstate 10, and to its terminus with intersection of the proposed Pinal North-South Freeway near Coolidge. Interstate 11 is part of a long-range vision for the Valley's future transportation needs, as defined by the Maricopa Association of Governments and ADOT. Interstate 11 was approved June 30, 2012 as part of the Moving Ahead for Progress in the 21st Century Act. In June 2013, a joint draft study commissioned by the respective DOTs of Arizona and Nevada concluded that the freeway was justified, citing benefits in travel, tourism, trade, and economic growth. The conclusion of the study further clears the way for Interstate 11's funding and implementation.

State Route 30 (Tres Rios Freeway)

The Tres Rios Freeway, has been proposed as an east–west freeway in an effort to move some West Valley motorists off of I-10 in an attempt to decrease traffic along that frequently congested Interstate. Its western beginning would be at Route 85, and it would run east to encounter proposed Loop 303, and continue through to Loop 202's South Mountain Freeway. From there it would continue east to a terminatus at Interstate 17 near downtown Phoenix at the Durango Curve. Construction of the proposed Route 30 (former SR 801) has been approved, and will begin sometime in the early 2020s based on funding and planning by the Maricopa Association of Governments. Following the approval of Interstate 11 in the 2012 Surface Transportation Act, a study for a Westward extension of SR 30 to I-11 will be conducted by MAG.

State Route 74 (Lake Pleasant Freeway)

Due to expected rapid growth in the northwestern reaches of the metropolitan area, long-term regional highway plans include acquisition of right-of-way for eventual future expansion of SR 74 to a freeway.

State Route 85 (future freeway from SR-30 to I-10)

The segment of SR-85 between Gila Bend to Buckeye is a connector between I-8 and I-10, and serves both as a connector from I-8 from San Diego to Phoenix. This segment is being upgraded to a divided highway, and is planned to become a freeway from SR-30 to I-10. Most of the 4-Lane road upgrades have already been completed.

Pinal North–South Freeway
ADOT is currently in the study phase of identifying a corridor for the planned Pinal North-South Freeway to serve expected growth in the Pinal County region of the Phoenix Metro area.  This future freeway would connect I-10 around Eloy with the Superstition Freeway (US 60) in Apache Junction, passing through Coolidge and Florence and intersecting with planned future alignments of the Hassayampa Freeway (I-11) and the Williams Gateway Freeway (SR 24).

White Tank Freeway
The White Tank Freeway is a new long-term freeway alignment designed to address expected rapid growth in the far northwest valley around Surprise and northern Buckeye.  The freeway will begin at the US 60 interchange with Loop 303 in Surprise, run concurrent with US 60 for several miles, then split off westward to connect with the planned future alignment of the Hassayampa Freeway (Interstate 11) west of Buckeye.

Named interchanges and features
The table below lists commonly used colloquialisms and nicknames for several interchanges and portions within the freeway system.

Funding
Phoenix has been expanding its highway system since 1985, when voters passed Proposition 300, which established a half-cent general sales tax to fund new urban freeways that were currently in the Regional Transportation Plan. At the time, this included the unbuilt or partially unbuilt: Sky Harbor Expressway, I-10, Route 51, Route 143, Loop 101, and Loop 202. Most of these were completed by 2005, with Loop 202 being in the final stage of construction.

In 1994, voters in Maricopa County voted against Proposition 400, which would have extended the half-cent sales tax extension from 2006 through 2016 had it been passed. Half of this additional funding would have been used for improvements in mass transit as well as new freeways. But because of the defeat, there was no funding beyond fiscal year 2006, regardless of if the Regional Transportation Plan was completed or not.

In 1996, the Maricopa Association of Governments Regional Council passed a series of bills provided funding for a Long Range Plan between fiscal years 2007 and 2015. The Red Mountain Freeway, Santan Freeway, and Sky Harbor Expressway segments, all of which were previously unfunded, became prioritized with construction commencing almost immediately.

In 1999, even more funding was given to accelerate construction of the Regional Transportation Plan by the State Legislature, which passed a bill called the "2007 Acceleration Plan". This bill forced the State Infrastructure Bank to assist in funds, which assisted in pushing the completion of Regional Transportation Plan forward to the end of 2007.

With the transportation tax set to expire in 2006, a revived Proposition 400 was put before the voters of Maricopa County in 2004, ten years after the original vote ended in failure.  Proposing an identical half-cent extension of the sales tax, the new proposition would extend the tax a full 20 years as opposed to the original 10.  Unlike its predecessor, the proposition passed by a wide 58-42% margin and established funding for several future projects including highways and mass transit.  A similar but much more wide-reaching proposal to enact a full one-cent sales tax increase over a 30-year period on a statewide level, much of which would have gone to funding Phoenix area projects, failed to qualify for the 2008 general election ballot due to issues with the petition.

However, the 1985 plan was not fully completed by 2007 due to the lingering unfinished segment of Loop 202 between University Drive and Power Road in Mesa, where work wrapped up on July 21, 2008.

Ramp metering
The Phoenix freeway system heavily utilizes ramp meters, with several currently installed in the metropolitan area located on I-10, I-17, Loop 101, Loop 202 (on the Red Mountain Freeway from I-10 to Gilbert Road, as well as at select interchanges on the SanTan Freeway from Dobson to Gilbert Road), SR 51, and US 60. Since their implementation in the 1980s, the goal of these has remained to "break up platoons" of cars by limiting the number that can enter a freeway at a time. The Arizona Department of Transportation (ADOT) states that this has been "tremendously successful".

Travel times program
On January 22, 2008, a test program was begun by ADOT which involved the placement of travel times to popular commuter destinations on variable message signs along inbound freeway routes during the morning peak hours and outbound routes in the evening. Initially, these signs were only activated on weekdays during peak travel hours (6am to 9am and 3pm to 7pm) and did not appear if there is a more urgent message to display; such as an Amber Alert or other emergency.  In late July 2015, the hours when travel times were displayed were extended.  Travel times are now displayed from 5am to 11pm on weekdays, and 7am to 9pm on weekends.

Logo signing program

Beginning in late 2013, several Phoenix area freeways began to receive logo signs at select exits, advertising food, lodging, gas, and attractions businesses.  This program was previously restricted only to rural highways within the state until the restriction was lifted in 2013, allowing the installation of these signs on most Phoenix area freeways and allowing increased revenue to the state.  As of December 2019, installation of logo signs on Phoenix area freeways is mostly complete, except for some non-freeway portions of Loop 303 and the Loop 202 Pastor Freeway.

Note that I-10 from Dysart Road westward, I-10 east of the Loop 202 SanTan Freeway interchange, I-17 north of the Loop 303 interchange, and US 60 east of the SuperRedTan interchange has had logo signs installed for many years, but have always been considered part of the state's rural logo sign program.  These segments have since been transitioned to the urban logo sign program in terms of pricing.

See also
 Transportation in Arizona
 Arizona Department of Transportation
 Valley Metro
 Maricopa Association of Governments

References

External links

 Urban Freeways - Arizona Roads

 
Freeways